Johann Joseph Thalherr (or Talherr), also known as  or  (1730 – 16 October 1801), was an Austrian architect.

Thalherr was born in Fulnek, Moravia (now Czech Republic).  He studied architecture in Vienna and, after graduation, worked there as court architect, under the direction of  Isidore Canevale.

In 1782 he moved to Buda and worked as chamber-architect, being promoted chief of the Hungarian Direction of Constructions, and remained there until his death. He is one of the main representatives of the Palladian revival in Central Europe. His constructions can be found in Budapest, Bratislava, Győr and several other Hungarian cities.

Main works

Silk factory (Filatorium), Budapest, 1785
The Catholic Church in Szekszárd (1794)
St. Joseph church, Budapest, 1798

References

Budapest churches: Józsefvárosi templom (church of Józsefváros) 
Farbaky Péter - Templomok, egyházi épületek 
Józsefvárosi pébániatemplom 
Tallherr József – Magyar Életrajzi Lexikon 1000-1990 
Thalherr, Joseph 
Szekszárd katolikus templomai 
To the manor born 

1730 births
1801 deaths
People from Fulnek
18th-century Austrian people
Czech Baroque architects
Hungarian Baroque architects
Hungarian people of Czech descent
Austro-Hungarian people
Moravian-German people